Coffey is an Irish surname, from Ó Cobhthaigh. Notable people with the surname include:

Aeneas Coffey (1780–1852), Irish inventor
Amir Coffey (born 1997), American basketball player
Ann Coffey (born 1946), British politician
Brian Coffey (1905–1995), Irish poet
Cath Coffey, British vocalist of Stereo MC's
Charles Coffey (?–1745), Irish playwright
Denise Coffey (1936–2022), British actress
Dennis Coffey, American guitarist
Ellie-Jean Coffey, Australian surfer, model, and actress
George Nelson Coffey (1875−1967), American pedologist
Greg Coffey (born 1971), Australian London-based hedge fund manager
Jack Coffey (baseball) (1887–1966), Major League Baseball player
John Coffey (disambiguation), several people
Joseph L. Coffey, Roman Catholic Bishop of the Archdiocese for the Military Services, USA
Kellie Coffey (born 1971), American singer-songwriter
Michael J. Coffey (c. 1840 – 1907), New York politician
Paul Coffey (born 1961), Canadian hockey player
Peter Coffey (1876–1943), Irish Roman Catholic priest and Neoscholastic philosopher
Rich Coffey, American owner of Fort Wayne Freedom, an indoor football team
Russell Coffey (1898–2007), one of the last three surviving American World War I veterans
 
Sean Coffey (born 1956), New York lawyer
Susanna Coffey, American artist
Tabatha Coffey, Australian hairstylist
Tāmati Coffey (born 1979), New Zealand broadcaster and politician
Thérèse Coffey, British Conservative Member of Parliament
Todd Coffey (born 1980), Major League Baseball relief pitcher
Victoria Coffey (1911–1999), Irish paediatrician
Virginia Coffey (1904–2003), American civil rights activist
Wayne Coffey (footballer) (born 1964), American football player
William Coffey (VC) (1829–1875), Irish Victoria Cross recipient
William Coffey (cricketer) (born 1885), Irish cricketer

See also

Justice Coffey (disambiguation)
Coffee (surname)

Anglicised Irish-language surnames